The National Democratic Convention (Nadeco) was a South African political party formed in August 2005 via floor crossing legislation by Ziba Jiyane, the former Inkatha Freedom Party (IFP) chairperson.

In September 2005 the provincial African Christian Democratic Party leader and MP Reverend Hawu Mbatha joined Nadeco. Ziba Jiyane left the IFP after a public feud with IFP President Mangosuthu Buthelezi over the direction of the IFP. Jiyane claimed that the IFP was not adequately democratic. Jiyane was suspended by the IFP leadership and resigned, forming Nadeco.

During the 2005 floor-crossing window a number of politicians joined the new party, leaving it with four seats in the national assembly, and four in the Kwazulu-Natal assembly.

In August 2006, however, Jiyane was suspended by the party for misconduct. After a protracted legal dispute with Mbatha, he formally split from the party in December 2007 and retired temporarily from politics, later forming the South African Democratic Congress in 2008.

Nadeco lost all of its national and provincial seats in the 2009 general election and subsequently disbanded.

Election results 

|-
!Election
!Votes
!%
!Seats
|-
| 2009
| align="right" | 10,830
| align="right" | 0.06
| align="right" | 0
|-
|}

References

2005 establishments in South Africa
2009 disestablishments in South Africa
Conservative parties in South Africa
Political parties established in 2005
Political parties disestablished in 2009
Defunct political parties in South Africa
Political parties in South Africa created by floor crossing